Dreissena carinata is a species of bivalves belonging to the family Dreissenidae.

Per IUCN, the species has the status "vulnerable".

References

Dreissenidae
Bivalves described in 1853
IUCN Red List vulnerable species